Adolf Ciborowski (25 May 1919 - 26 January 1987) was a Polish architect, urban planner and politician.

Life
Ciborowski was born on 25 May 1919 in Warsaw. He graduated from the Warsaw University of Technology in 1946. In the years 1947–1948 he worked as director of the City Planning Bureau in Szczecin. He was the Chief Architect of Warsaw between 1956 and 1964. He contributed to the rebuilding of Warsaw after the Second World War. He was hired as a planner for war-damaged Hannover and was the first foreigner to receive a town-planning prize from Leibniz University Hannover (in 1965). He also worked as consultant on the master plan for Baghdad and supervised the reconstruction and urban plan of Skopje alongside Stanisław Janowski after its destruction by an earthquake in 1963.

He was a member of the Association of Polish Architects (SARP) as well as the Polish Academy of Sciences. He also worked as a UNESCO and UNCHS advisor on the reconstruction of cities damaged by earthquakes. He died in 1987 and was buried at the Powązki Cemetery in Warsaw.

Honours
Officer's Cross of the Order of Polonia Restituta (Poland)
Medal of the 10th Anniversary of People's Poland
Medal of the 30th Anniversary of People's Poland
Medal of the 40th Anniversary of People's Poland
Order of the Yugoslav Flag (Yugoslavia)
Order of the Crown (Belgium)

See also
Urban planning

References

Architects from Warsaw
Polish politicians
1919 births
1987 deaths
Warsaw University of Technology alumni
20th-century Polish architects